The 8th Massachusetts Regiment also known as 16th Continental Regiment and Sargent's Regiment, was raised on April 23, 1775, under Colonel Paul Dudley Sargent at Cambridge, Massachusetts. The regiment would see action at the Battle of Bunker Hill, New York and New Jersey Campaign, Battle of Trenton, Battle of Princeton and the Battle of Saratoga. The regiment was furloughed June 12, 1783, at West Point, New York and disbanded on November 3, 1783.

External links
Bibliography of the Continental Army in Massachusetts compiled by the United States Army Center of Military History

Massachusetts regiments of the Continental Army
Military units and formations established in 1775
Military units and formations disestablished in 1783